Taiwan dollar can refer to either of the following:

 Taiwan yen issued by the colonial government of Taiwan under Japanese rule from 1895 to 1945, 
 Old Taiwan dollar used from 1946 to 1949 
 New Taiwan dollar the currency of Taiwan since 1949.